Mykhailo Yosyfovych Holovko (born 3 May 1983) is a Ukrainian politician. He served as a People's Deputy of Ukraine in the 7th and 8th convocations, representing Ukraine's 164th electoral district in northern Ternopil Oblast as a member of Svoboda.

Life 
 2000 — graduated from Ternopil Public School No. 9 and entered Ternopil Academy of National Economy (now Ternopil National Economic University), speciality «International Economy».
 Having graduated from the institution of Higher Education (2005), he got the master's degree diploma.
 In 2006 he entered the postgraduate department at Ternopil Ivan Pul'uj National Technical University, department «Marketing at Enterprise» (graduated from it in 2011).
 2012 — he got a diploma of the specialist, speciality “Law” in Inter-regional Academy of personnel management (Kyiv)
 2007—2012 — a private entrepreneur (he was engaged in air-conditioning systems and ventilation systems setting).
 2011—2012 — the head deputy of Ternopil Regional Organization All-Ukrainian Union Svoboda.

Public-Political Activity 
 2002 — he became a member of all-Ukrainian Union "Svoboda".
 2006 — he became the head of Ternopil city organization all-Ukrainian Union "Svoboda".
 2006—2010 — a Deputy of Ternopil City Council of the Vth convocation.
 2007 — he was included into the list of candidates of Ukraine's people's deputies from all-Ukrainian Union "Svoboda"  under number 56.
 2010—2012 — a Deputy of Ternopil City Council of the VІth convocation.
 2011 — was elected a deputy head of Ternopil Regional Organization of all-Ukrainian Union "Svoboda".
 28 October 2012 — was elected the Verkhovna Rada of People's Deputy of Ukraine  of the 7th convocation at single-seat electoral district No. 164.
 He was a participant of Revolution of Dignity, was a superintendent of the camp site in Luteranska Street.
 At snap elections to the Verkhovna Rada in 2014 he was elected a people's deputy at election district  No. 164 (Ternopil Region) from all-Ukrainian Union "Svoboda". He is a member of the Verkhovna Rada Committee on taxes and customs policy. He is a member of interfactional deputies' all-Ukrainian Union "Svoboda".

Awards 
24 July 2011 in Khorostkiv a celebrant of Ukrainian Orthodox Church of Kyivan Patriarchate Philaret after Divine Liturgy to honour St. rivnoapostil princess Olga and to honour consecrate cathedral of Saint Volodymyr and Olga awarded Mykhailo Holovko with the Order of St. rivnoaspostil Knight Volodymyr the Great. Holovko was awarded with the Order of St Nicholas the Wondermaker for the merits in rebirth of spirituality in Ukraine and local Ukrainian Orthodox Church settlement. He was awarded with medal for «Victimization and Love to Ukraine» and anniversary medal to 75 Years of Ukrainian Insurgent Army in Ternopil.

Family 
Father — Holovko Iosyf Bogdanovych, was born in Rozhysk Village,  Pidvolochyskyi Region.Mother — Holovko (Yarotska) Galyna Ruslanivna, was born in Toky Village. Wife – Mariana Holovko (Shevchuk). Children — Gordii, Lukian and Bogdan.

Notes

1983 births
Living people
People from Ternopil Oblast
Seventh convocation members of the Verkhovna Rada
Eighth convocation members of the Verkhovna Rada
Svoboda (political party) politicians